The Timor shrew or thin shrew (Crocidura tenuis) is a species of mammal in the family Soricidae. It is endemic to Timor.

References

Crocidura
Mammals of Timor
Mammals of Indonesia
Fauna of the Lesser Sunda Islands
Vulnerable fauna of Asia
Mammals described in 1840
Taxonomy articles created by Polbot